"Madam Butterfly" is a 1967 Australian TV adaptation of Puccini's opera Madama Butterfly. It aired on 19 April 1967 as part of Wednesday Theatre.

It was produced by Peter Page in the Gore Hill Studios, Sydney, starring the Chinese soprano and film actress, Kiang Haw as Madam Butterfly, and an Asian cast.

References

External links
 Wednesday Theatre at Austlit

1967 television plays
1967 Australian television episodes
1960s Australian television plays
Australian television plays based on operas
Wednesday Theatre (season 3) episodes